Pak Yong-chol (born 16 May 1981) is a North Korean former footballer. He represented North Korea on at least six occasions between 2003 and 2007, scoring once.

Career statistics

International

International goals
Scores and results list North Korea's goal tally first, score column indicates score after each North Korea goal.

References

1981 births
Living people
North Korean footballers
North Korea international footballers
Association football defenders
Wolmido Sports Club players